Centron may refer to:
 a brand name for ormeloxifene
 Centron Corporation, a former industrial and educational film production company
 Centron (weevil), a beetle genus in the tribe Alophini